Certhilauda is a genus of larks in the family Alaudidae living in the southern regions of Africa. The genus was formerly named Heterocorys.

Taxonomy and systematics

Extant species
The genus Certhilauda contains six species:
 Short-clawed lark (Certhilauda chuana)
 Karoo long-billed lark (Certhilauda subcoronata)
 Benguela long-billed lark (Certhilauda benguelensis)
 Eastern long-billed lark (Certhilauda semitorquata)
 Cape long-billed lark (Certhilauda curvirostris)
 Agulhas long-billed lark (Certhilauda brevirostris)

Former species
Some authorities, either presently or formerly, recognize several additional species or subspecies as belonging to the genus Certhilauda, including:
 Greater hoopoe-lark (as the bifasciated lark, Certhilauda desertorum)
 Eastern greater hoopoe-lark (as Certhilauda doriae)
 Spike-heeled lark (as Certhilauda albofasciata)
 Spike-heeled lark (kalahariae) (as Certhilauda kalahariae)
 Spike-heeled lark (garrula) (as Certhilauda garrula)
 Rufous-rumped lark (as Certhilauda erythropygia)
 Karoo lark (as Certhilauda albescens)
 Red lark (as Certhilauda burra, Certhilauda erythroclamys or Certhilauda harei)
 Dune lark (as Certhilauda erythrochlamys)
 Barlow's lark (as Certhilauda barlowi)
 Somali lark (as Certhilauda somalica)

References

 
Bird genera
 
Taxonomy articles created by Polbot